Bira railway station is a small railway station in North 24 Parganas district, West Bengal. Its code is BIRA. It serves Bira town. The station consists of two platforms. The platform is not well sheltered. It lacks many facilities including water and sanitation.

Station

Location
Bira is located on Sealdah–Hasnabad–Bangaon–Ranaghat line of Kolkata Suburban Railway. Link between Dum Dum to Khulna now in Bangladesh, via Bangaon was constructed by Bengal Central Railway Company in 1882–84. The Sealah–Dum Dum–Barasat–Ashok Nagar–Bangaon sector was electrified in 1963–64.

Layout

See also

References

External links 

 Bira Station Map

Sealdah railway division
Railway stations in North 24 Parganas district
Kolkata Suburban Railway stations